Colors is the sixth studio album by House of Heroes released on July 1, 2016 through Bad Christian Music.  It is a concept album that involves three fictional characters: Eric, Axel, and Joni.

Critical reception

Nicholas Senior describes, "Colors isn’t immediate, but with time it proves to be the group’s most complete album yet." Christopher Smith says, "Colors is...an ambitious and unique piece of art that is best experienced with speakers blaring." Jonathan J. Francesco writes, "Colors finds them doing what they do best." Tim Dodderidge states, "It’s rare to find a concept record with so many standout tracks, and Colors is chock full of them." Dave Appelt suggests, "This album has plenty of memorable moments". Dylan O'Connor responds, "it's another wonderful addition to House of Heroes' already impressive catalog." Michael Weaver replies, "Colors...is a concept album that features some of the band's best musical pieces to date". Jon Ownbey believes, "As a whole, this is a definite pass over."

Track listing

Charts

References

2016 albums
House of Heroes albums